The Donald C. Tillman Water Reclamation Plant is a water reclamation plant located in Van Nuys, Los Angeles, Southern California, US.  The plant was conceived of, designed and constructed by the City of Los Angeles' Bureau of Engineering.  The Administration Building was designed by California architect Anthony J. Lumsden. It is home to The Japanese Garden, which has been used as a backdrop in films and TV, including Dead Heat,  Matlock, Knight Rider,  Bio-Dome, Twins, and Starfleet Academy from Star Trek. 

The facility treats and reclaims wastewater, removing it from the sewer system and reducing the need for large sewer pipes downstream from the plant. The treated water is discharged to the lake in the adjacent Balboa Park, and then flows into the Los Angeles River where it comprises the majority of the flow.  The plant began operation in 1985 and processes  of waste a day, producing  of recycled water. It is named after Donald C. Tillman, the city engineer from 1972 to 1980.

References

External links
 Tillman Water Reclamation Plant at LA Sanitation
 City of Los Angeles: Japanese Garden

Sewage treatment plants in California
Buildings and structures in Los Angeles
Water supply and sanitation in the United States
Los Angeles River
Van Nuys, Los Angeles